Nelleva is an unincorporated community in Brazos County, in the U.S. state of Texas. According to the Handbook of Texas, no population estimates were available for the community in 2000. It is located within the Bryan-College Station metropolitan area.

History
The area in what is now known as Nelleva today was founded at the start of the 20th century as a railroad station on the International-Great Northern Railroad. There was a church and several scattered houses in 1940. Only the houses remained in Nelleva in 1980 and continued to be listed on county maps in 1992. 

The Mexia-Nelleva Cutoff was built to shorten the distance between it and Mexia in 1905.

Geography

Education
Nelleva had its own school in 1940 and joined the Navasota Independent School District in the 1960s.

References

Unincorporated communities in Brazos County, Texas
Unincorporated communities in Texas